Elminius is a genus of barnacles in the family Elminiidae, containing these species:
 Elminius kingii Gray, 1831
 Elminius cristallinus Gruvel, 1907

Several species previously placed in the genus Elminius have been transferred to Austrominius, Epopella, Matellonius, and Protelminius.

References

Austrobalanidae
Arthropod genera